Philemon Bliss (July 28, 1813 – August 25, 1889) was an Ohio Congressman, the first chief justice of the Supreme Court of Dakota Territory, and a Missouri Supreme Court justice.

Early life and education
Bliss was born in Canton, Connecticut in 1813 to Asahel Bliss and Lydia Adams (Griswold) Bliss. He attended Fairfield Academy and Hamilton College, where he studied law. He moved to Elyria, Ohio, where he studied law under his brother Albert.

Career
In 1840 Bliss passed the bar and began practicing law, first in Cuyahoga Falls, Ohio and later in Elyria, Ohio. On November 16, 1843 he married Martha W. Thorpe. They had three children. He served as presiding judge of the 14th Judicial Circuit of Ohio from 1848 through 1851. Bliss ran for congressional office as a republican and was elected to the United States House of Representatives. He served in the 34th Congress as an Oppositionist and 35th Congress as a Republican, but did not run for re-election in 1858. President Abraham Lincoln appointed Bliss chief justice of the Supreme Court of Dakota Territory in 1861. He also served as associate justice  of the Supreme Court of Missouri from 1868 through 1872.

Later career
After his retirement from the bench, Bliss became Law Dean for the University of Missouri, where he served until his death in Saint Paul, Minnesota in 1889.  He is buried at the Columbia Cemetery in Columbia, Missouri.

Legacy
The Philemon Bliss Scholarship was established at the University of Missouri School of Law in his honor.

References

1813 births
1889 deaths
People from Canton, Connecticut
Opposition Party members of the United States House of Representatives from Ohio
Ohio Republicans
Republican Party members of the United States House of Representatives
Ohio state court judges
Judges of the Supreme Court of Missouri
Justices of the Dakota Territorial Supreme Court
19th-century American judges
Ohio lawyers
Politicians from Columbia, Missouri
People from Elyria, Ohio
Politicians from Saint Paul, Minnesota
People from Cuyahoga Falls, Ohio
Hamilton College (New York) alumni
University of Missouri alumni
University of Missouri faculty
Burials at Columbia Cemetery (Columbia, Missouri)
19th-century American politicians
19th-century American lawyers